{{DISPLAYTITLE:5-HT3 receptor}}The 5-HT3 receptor belongs to the Cys-loop superfamily of ligand-gated ion channels (LGICs) and therefore differs structurally and functionally from all other 5-HT receptors (5-hydroxytryptamine, or serotonin receptors) which are G protein-coupled receptors. This ion channel is cation-selective and mediates neuronal depolarization and excitation within the central and peripheral nervous systems.

As with other ligand gated ion channels, the 5-HT3 receptor consists of five subunits arranged around a central ion conducting pore, which is permeable to sodium (Na), potassium (K), and calcium (Ca) ions. Binding of the neurotransmitter 5-hydroxytryptamine (serotonin) to the 5-HT3 receptor opens the channel, which, in turn, leads to an excitatory response in neurons. The rapidly activating, desensitizing, inward current is predominantly carried by sodium and potassium ions. 5-HT3 receptors have a negligible permeability to anions.  They are most closely related by homology to the nicotinic acetylcholine receptor.

Structure

The 5-HT3 receptor differs markedly in structure and mechanism from the other 5-HT receptor subtypes, which are all G-protein-coupled. A functional channel may be composed of five identical 5-HT3A subunits (homopentameric) or a mixture of 5-HT3A and one of the other four 5-HT3B, 5-HT3C, 5-HT3D, or 5-HT3E subunits (heteropentameric). It appears that only the 5-HT3A subunits form functional homopentameric channels.  All other subunit subtypes must heteropentamerize with 5-HT3A subunits to form functional channels. Additionally, there has not currently been any pharmacological difference found between the heteromeric 5-HT3AC, 5-HT3AD, 5-HT3AE, and the homomeric 5-HT3A receptor. N-terminal glycosylation of receptor subunits is critical for subunit assembly and plasma membrane trafficking.  The subunits surround a central ion channel in a pseudo-symmetric manner (Fig.1).  Each subunit comprises an extracellular N-terminal domain which comprises the orthosteric ligand-binding site; a transmembrane domain consisting of four interconnected alpha helices (M1-M4), with the extracellular M2-M3 loop involved in the gating mechanism; a large cytoplasmic domain between M3 and M4 involved in receptor trafficking and regulation; and a short extracellular C-terminus (Fig.1).  Whereas extracellular domain is the site of action of agonists and competitive antagonists, the transmembrane domain contains the central ion pore, receptor gate, and principle selectivity filter that allows ions to cross the cell membrane.

Human and mouse genes 
The genes encoding human 5-HT3 receptors are located on chromosomes 11 (HTR3A, HTR3B) and 3 (HTR3C, HTR3D, HTR3E), so it appears that they have arisen from gene duplications. The genes HTR3A and HTR3B encode the 5-HT3A and 5-HT3B subunits and HTR3C, HTR3D and HTR3E encode the 5-HT3C, 5-HT3D and 5-HT3E subunits. HTR3C and HTR3E do not seem to form functional homomeric channels, but when co-expressed with HTR3A they form heteromeric complex with decreased or increased 5-HT efficacies. The pathophysiological role for these additional subunits has yet to be identified.

The human 5-HT3A receptor gene is similar in structure to the mouse gene which has 9 exons and is spread over ~13 kb. Four of its introns are exactly in the same position as the introns in the homologous α7-acetylcholine receptor gene, clearly showing their evolutionary relationship.

Expression. The 5-HT3C, 5-HT3D and 5-HT3E genes tend to show peripherally restricted pattern of expression, with high levels in the gut. In human duodenum and stomach, for example, 5-HT3C and 5-HT3E mRNA might be greater than for 5-HT3A and 5-HT3B.

Polymorphism. In patients treated with chemotherapeutic drugs, certain polymorphism of the HTR3B gene could predict successful antiemetic treatment. This could indicate that  the 5-HTR3B receptor subunit could be used as biomarker of  antiemetic drug efficacy.

Tissue distribution
The 5-HT3 receptor is expressed throughout the central and peripheral nervous systems and mediates a variety of physiological functions.  On a cellular level, it has been shown that postsynaptic 5-HT3 receptors mediate fast excitatory synaptic transmission in rat neocortical interneurons, amygdala, and hippocampus, and in ferret visual cortex.  5-HT3 receptors are also present on presynaptic nerve terminals. There is some evidence for a role in modulation of neurotransmitter release, but evidence is inconclusive.

Effects
When the receptor is activated to open the ion channel by agonists, the following effects are observed:
 CNS: nausea and vomiting center in brain stem, anxiety, as well as anticonvulsant  and pro-nociceptive activity.
 PNS: neuronal excitation (in autonomic, nociceptive neurons), emesis

Agonists
Agonists for the receptor include:
 Cereulide
 2-methyl-5-HT
 Alpha-Methyltryptamine
 Bufotenin
 Chlorophenylbiguanide
 Ethanol
 Ibogaine
 Phenylbiguanide
 Quipazine
 RS-56812: Potent and selective 5-HT3 partial agonist, 1000x selectivity over other serotonin receptors
 SR-57227
 Varenicline
 YM-31636
 S 21007 (SAR c.f. CGS-12066A)

Antagonists

Antagonists for the receptor (sorted by their respective therapeutic application) include:
 Antiemetics
 AS-8112
 Granisetron
 Ondansetron
 Tropisetron
 Gastroprokinetics
 Alosetron
 Batanopride
 Metoclopramide (high doses)
 Renzapride
 Zacopride
 M1, the major active metabolite of mosapride
 Antidepressants
 Mianserin
 Mirtazapine
 Vortioxetine
 Antipsychotics
 Clozapine
 Olanzapine
 Quetiapine
 Antimalarials
 Quinine
 Chloroquine
 Mefloquine
 Others
 3-Tropanyl indole-3-carboxylate
 Cannabidiol (CBD)
 Delta-9-Tetrahydrocannabinol
 Lamotrigine (epilepsy and bipolar disorder)
 Memantine (Alzheimer's disease medication)
 Menthol
 Thujone

Positive Allosteric Modulators
These agents are not agonists at the receptor, but increase the affinity or efficacy of the receptors for an agonist:
Indole Derivatives
 5-chloroindole
Small Organic Anaesthetics
 Ethanol
 Chloroform
 Halothane
 Isoflurane

Discovery
Identification of the 5-HT3 receptor did not take place until 1986, lacking selective pharmacological tools. However, with the discovery that the 5-HT3 receptor plays a prominent role in chemotherapy- and radiotherapy-induced vomiting, and the concomitant development of selective 5-HT3 receptor antagonists to suppress these side effects aroused intense interest from the pharmaceutical industry and therefore the identification of 5-HT3 receptors in cell lines and native tissues quickly followed.

See also
 5-HT1 receptor
 5-HT2 receptor
 5-HT4 receptor
 5-HT5 receptor
 5-HT6 receptor
 5-HT7 receptor

References

External links
 

Ion channels
Serotonin receptors